Carnaval is the fourth album by Spyro Gyra, released in 1980. It was given gold record status on June 1, 1987.

At Billboard magazine, Carnaval reached No. 49 on the Top 200 Albums chart. The song "Cafe Amore" reached No. 77 on the Hot 100 singles chart and No. 14 on the Adult Contemporary singles chart.

Track listing 
 "Cafe Amore" (Chet Catallo) – 5:02 (album version) 4:12 (single edit version)
 "Dizzy" (Tom Schuman, Eli Konikoff) – 4:40
 "Awakening" (Jeremy Wall) – 5:48
 "Cachaca" (Beckenstein) – 4:18
 "Fox Trot" (Beckenstein) – 4:40
 "Sweet 'n' Savvy" (Schuman) – 5:12
 "Bittersweet" (Beckenstein) – 4:28
 "Carnaval" (Wall) – 5:26

Personnel 
Credits adapted from AllMusic.

Band
 Jay Beckenstein – saxophone (1-8), acoustic piano (4)
 Tom Schuman – keyboards (1, 2, 4-7)
 Jeremy Wall – keyboards (3, 8)
 Dave Samuels – marimba (2, 5-8), vibraphone (2, 5-8)
 Chet Catallo – guitar (1-7)
 Jim Kurzdorfer – bass (3)
 Eli Konikoff – drums (1, 2, 3, 5, 6, 7)
 Gerardo Velez – percussion (2-6, 8)

Guests
 Michael Brecker – flute (1)
 Randy Brecker – trumpet (1, 2, 5, 8)
 Rob Mounsey – Polyphonic synthesizer (1-7)
 Hiram Bullock – guitar (2, 8), guitar solo (2)
 John Tropea – guitar (3-7), guitar solo (4, 7)
 Will Lee – bass (1, 2, 4-8)
 Steve Jordan – drums (4, 8)
 Errol "Crusher" Bennett – congas (1, 4, 6, 7, 8), percussion (1, 4, 6, 7, 8)
 Richard Calandra – percussion (3)
 Steve Kroon – percussion (4, 8)
  David Darling – cello (2, 3)

Horn Section
 Jay Beckenstein – alto saxophone 
 Michael Brecker – tenor saxophone
 Tom Malone – trombone
 Randy Brecker – trumpet

String Section
 Jonathan Abramowitz – cello
 Jesse Levy – cello 
 Sanford Allen – violin
 Lamar Alsop – violin
 Peter Dimitriadies – violin
 Harold Kohon – violin
 Harry Lookofsky – violin, concertmaster
 Guy Lumia – violin
 Matthew Raimondi – violin
 Richard Sortomme – violin

Production 
 Jay Beckenstein – producer
 Richard Calandra – producer
 Jeremy Wall – assistant producer, horn and string arrangements (1-5, 7, 8), conductor (1-5, 7, 8)
 Tom Schuman – horn and string arrangements (6), conductor (6)
 Michael Barry – engineer, mixing 
 Neil Dorfsman – engineer, mixing
 Jack Malken – engineer, mixing
 Jason Corsaro – assistant engineer
 Chris Howard – assistant engineer
 Lucy Leslie – assistant engineer
 Bob Ludwig – mastering at Masterdisk (New York, NY).
 George Osaki – art direction, design 
 David Heffernan – cover artwork 
 Waring Abbott – band and sleeve photography 
 Eliott Saltzman – studio photography

References

1980 albums
Spyro Gyra albums
MCA Records albums